Notre-Dame-de-Bon-Secours was a former municipality in Quebec.  On March 15, 2000, it amalgamated into the city of Richelieu.

Education

The South Shore Protestant Regional School Board previously served the municipality.

References

Former municipalities in Quebec
Populated places disestablished in 2000